Petri AG was an automotive parts company based in Germany. It was acquired by the Japanese company Takata Corporation in 2000, forming the European subsidiary Takata-Petri. In 2018, operations became part of the new Joyson Safety Systems as Joyson Safety Systems Aschaffenburg GmbH, after the 2017 bankruptcy of Takata and subsequent purchase by Key Safety Systems.

History 
Petri AG was founded in Aschaffenburg in 1899 by Richard Petri and started to produce steering wheels and interior trims.
Richard Petri founded the first plant (Plant 01) in Aschaffenburg, which is now the European Headquarters of Takata-Petri. Later, Petri's firm expanded further and added other plants for the production of plastic parts, like the Plant 02 in Nilkheim, near Aschaffenburg and Plant 03 in Albertshausen, near Bad Kissingen. Steering wheel production is still located in Aschaffenburg. Other plastic components and interior trims are mostly produced in Albertshausen. Aside from these plants, Petri also founded some research and assembly plants later on. In 1981, Petri AG developed and produced the first airbag system in collaboration with Mercedes-Benz. In 2000, Japanese competitor Takata Corporation acquired Petri AG, forming the subsidiary Takata-Petri, renamed Takata AG in early 2012.

Takata AG was a global leader in the production of steering wheels and plastic parts, not only in the automotive industry. After the 2017 Takata bankruptcy, the major assets were acquired by Key Safety Systems which was renamed in 2018 to Joyson Safety Systems.

References

External links 
joysonsafety.com – Joyson Safety Systems Official website
http://www.tooling.eu.joysonsafety.com/en/ - Joyson Safety Systems Aschaffenburg GmbH

Auto parts suppliers of Japan
Vehicle safety technologies
Safety engineering
Defunct motor vehicle manufacturers of Germany
Manufacturing companies established in 1899
Manufacturing companies disestablished in 2000
German companies established in 1899
German companies disestablished in 2000